is a railway station on the Senmō Main Line in Kiyosato, Hokkaido, Japan, operated by the Hokkaido Railway Company (JR Hokkaido).

Lines
Kiyosatochō Station is served by the Senmō Main Line, and is numbered B69.

Adjacent stations

External links
 JR Hokkaido Kiyosatochō Station information 

Stations of Hokkaido Railway Company
Railway stations in Hokkaido Prefecture
Railway stations in Japan opened in 1929